Flirting with Disaster may refer to:

Films
Flirting with Disaster (film), 1996 American comedy film written and directed by David O. Russell

Television 
"Flirting with Disaster", the 49th episode of The Simple Life (Goes to Camp 2007 series) 
"Flirting with Disaster", the 32nd episode of Danny Phantom (Season 2: 2005–2006)
"Flirting with Disaster", the 8th episode of Rules of Engagement (Season 2)
"Flirting with Disaster", the 6th episode of The Real World: Cancun
"Flirting with Disaster", the 26th episode of season 6 (170th of the series) of Beverly Hills, 90210
"Flirting with Disaster", the 3rd episode of The Gregory Hines Show
"Flirting with Disaster", the 4th episode of Rita Rocks (season 1: 2008–2009)
"Flirting with Disaster" (American Dad!), the 19th episode of season 6 of American Dad!
"Flirting with Disaster: Co-Ed Canoe Trip", the 17th episode of Bug Juice

Music
Flirting with Disaster (soundtrack), soundtrack of film Flirting with Disaster
Flirting with Disaster (Jill Johnson album), 2011
Flirting with Disaster (Lorraine Feather album), 2015
Flirtin' with Disaster, 1979 album by American southern rock band Molly Hatchet
Flirtin' with Disaster (song), a song from the above-mentioned Molly Hatchet album
"Flirting with Disaster", a song by Bruce Willis from his album The Return of Bruno